Patryk Dobek (born 13 February 1994) is a Polish athlete and soldier. He is specialising in the 400 metres, 800 metres and 400 metres hurdles. He won the bronze medal at the 2020 Summer Olympics in the 800 metres event.

Achievements

References

External links

1994 births
Living people
Polish male sprinters
Polish male hurdlers
People from Kościerzyna
Sportspeople from Pomeranian Voivodeship
World Athletics Championships athletes for Poland
Athletes (track and field) at the 2016 Summer Olympics
Olympic athletes of Poland
Polish Athletics Championships winners
Universiade medalists in athletics (track and field)
Universiade bronze medalists for Poland
Medalists at the 2019 Summer Universiade
Competitors at the 2017 Summer Universiade
European Athletics Indoor Championships winners
Athletes (track and field) at the 2020 Summer Olympics
Medalists at the 2020 Summer Olympics
Olympic bronze medalists for Poland
Olympic bronze medalists in athletics (track and field)
21st-century Polish people